Bessey is a surname. Notable people with the surname include:

Charles A. Bessey (1848–1909), American soldier and Medal of Honor recipient
Charles Edwin Bessey (1845–1915), American botanist
Ernst Bessey (1877–1957), American botanist, son of Charles Edwin Bessey
Joanna Bessey (born 1976), Asian film and television actress
Joe Bessey (born 1961), NASCAR owner and driver